Jerzy Orłowski (16 February 1925 – 28 March 2015) was a Polish footballer who played as a defender for Skra Częstochowa, Legia Warsaw and the Poland national team.

References

1925 births
2015 deaths
Sportspeople from Częstochowa
Polish footballers
Association football defenders
Poland international footballers
Legia Warsaw players
Skra Częstochowa players